The Convention on Registration of Objects Launched into Outer Space (commonly known as the Registration Convention) was adopted by the United Nations General Assembly in 1974 and went into force in 1976. As of February 2022, it has been ratified by 72 states.

The convention requires states to furnish to the United Nations with details about the orbit of each space object.  A registry of launchings was already being maintained by the United Nations as a result of a General Assembly Resolution in 1962.

The Registration Convention and four other space law treaties are administered by the United Nations Committee on the Peaceful Uses of Outer Space.

The European Space Agency, European Organization for the Exploitation of Meteorological Satellites, the European Telecommunications Satellite Organization, and the Intersputnik International Organization of Space Communications have submitted declarations of acceptance of rights and obligations according to the convention.

Current status
The register is kept by the United Nations Office for Outer Space Affairs (UNOOSA) and includes
 Name of launching State
 An appropriate designator of the space object or its registration number
 Date and territory or location of launch
 Basic orbital parameters (Nodal period, Inclination, Apogee and Perigee)
 General function of the space object

Information on registered objects is available at the UNOOSA site

List of states parties 
There are currently 72 states parties to the Convention.

Signatories that are not parties 
There are three states which have signed, but not ratified, the Convention.

Organizations accepting the rights and obligations 
Several intergovernmental organizations, which cannot be party to the Convention, have nonetheless notified the Secretary-General of the United Nations that they have accepted the rights and obligations of the Convention.

Proposals
A General Assembly resolution from December 2007 that was accepted by consensus recommended that the data should be extended to include:

 Coordinated Universal Time as the time reference for the date of launch;
 Kilometres, minutes and degrees as the standard units for basic orbital parameters;
 Any useful information relating to the function of the space object in addition to the general function requested by the Registration Convention
 The geostationary orbit location, if appropriate
 Any change of status in operations (e.g., when a space object is no longer functional)
 The approximate date of decay or re-entry
 The date and physical conditions of moving a space object to a disposal orbit
 Web links to official information on space objects

Background
For many years, concern has existed surrounding the growing number of dead or inactive satellites in space. These litter the part of space near geostationary orbit and pose a major threat, as any collision would produce serious damage or loss of satellites. As of 2021, there are nearly 12,000 objects registered in the UNOOSA Online Index of Objects Launched into Outer Space.

Notes

References

External links
 UNOOSA webpage for the Convention
Chapter XXIV OUTER SPACE 1. Convention on registration of objects launched into outer space at the Depositary of the United Nations Treaty Collection

Space treaties
Treaties concluded in 1974
Treaties entered into force in 1976
Treaties adopted by United Nations General Assembly resolutions
United Nations treaties
Treaties of Algeria
Treaties of Argentina
Treaties of Antigua and Barbuda
Treaties of Armenia
Treaties of Australia
Treaties of Austria
Treaties of Bahrain
Treaties of the Byelorussian Soviet Socialist Republic
Treaties of Belgium
Treaties of the military dictatorship in Brazil
Treaties of the People's Republic of Bulgaria
Treaties of Canada
Treaties of Chile
Treaties of the People's Republic of China
Treaties of Colombia
Treaties of Costa Rica
Treaties of Cuba
Treaties of Cyprus
Treaties of the Czech Republic
Treaties of Czechoslovakia
Treaties of North Korea
Treaties of Denmark
Treaties of Finland
Treaties of France
Treaties of West Germany
Treaties of East Germany
Treaties of Greece
Treaties of the Hungarian People's Republic
Treaties of India
Treaties of Indonesia
Treaties of Italy
Treaties of Japan
Treaties of Kazakhstan
Treaties of Kuwait
Treaties of Lebanon
Treaties of the Libyan Arab Jamahiriya
Treaties of Liechtenstein
Treaties of Lithuania
Treaties of Luxembourg
Treaties of Mexico
Treaties of the Mongolian People's Republic
Treaties of Montenegro
Treaties of Morocco
Treaties of the Netherlands
Treaties of New Zealand
Treaties of Niger
Treaties of Nigeria
Treaties of Norway
Treaties of Oman
Treaties of Pakistan
Treaties of Peru
Treaties of the Polish People's Republic
Treaties of Portugal
Treaties of Qatar
Treaties of South Korea
Treaties of the Soviet Union
Treaties of Saudi Arabia
Treaties of Serbia and Montenegro
Treaties of Seychelles
Treaties of Slovakia
Treaties of Slovenia
Treaties of South Africa
Treaties of Spain
Treaties of Saint Vincent and the Grenadines
Treaties of Sweden
Treaties of Switzerland
Treaties of Turkey
Treaties of the Ukrainian Soviet Socialist Republic
Treaties of the United Arab Emirates
Treaties of the United Kingdom
Treaties of the United States
Treaties of Uruguay
Treaties of Venezuela
Treaties of Yugoslavia
1974 in New York City
Treaties extended to the Netherlands Antilles
Treaties extended to Saint Christopher-Nevis-Anguilla
Treaties extended to the Faroe Islands
Treaties extended to Greenland
Treaties extended to British Antigua and Barbuda
Treaties extended to Brunei (protectorate)
Treaties extended to British Dominica
Treaties extended to the British Solomon Islands
Treaties extended to British Saint Vincent and the Grenadines
Treaties extended to Aruba
Treaties extended to Bermuda
Treaties extended to the British Virgin Islands
Treaties extended to British Hong Kong
Treaties extended to the Cayman Islands
Treaties extended to the Falkland Islands
Treaties extended to Gibraltar
Treaties extended to Montserrat
Treaties extended to the Pitcairn Islands
Treaties extended to Saint Helena, Ascension and Tristan da Cunha
Treaties extended to South Georgia and the South Sandwich Islands
Treaties extended to the Turks and Caicos Islands
Treaties extended to West Berlin